Raymond IV may refer to:

Raymond IV of Pallars Jussà (count, 1047–1098)
Raymond IV, Count of Toulouse (r. 1094 - 1105), also count of Tripoli (1102–1105)
Raymond IV, Count of Tripoli (r. 1187–1189)